Key West is an American comedy-drama series set and filmed in Key West, Florida. Thirteen episodes aired on Fox from January to June 1993. It was created by David Beaird. The show was produced by Viacom Productions (now CBS Television Studios).

Plot
The main character is Seamus O'Neill, played by Fisher Stevens, a factory worker from New Jersey who dreams of being a writer. When he wins the lottery, he uses his newfound wealth to move to Key West to pursue his writing career, where his idol Ernest Hemingway had lived. Seamus finds the island inhabited by eccentrics. He tries to get a job for The Meteor, a local newspaper, wishing to relive the life of its most famous employee, Ernest Hemingway. This brings him into conflict with the paper's editor, Roosevelt Cole (Ivory Ocean), who remarks "You want to report on the Spanish Civil War?" Eventually Seamus is hired on a probationary period. In a later episode it was revealed Seamus is once again poor as his lottery winnings were seized due to taxation and multiple unpaid debts, and it will be several years before his next annuity check resumes. Seamus then decides to put everything into writing, money worries or not.

In addition to Stevens, Jennifer Tilly, Denise Crosby, and Brian Thompson led the large ensemble cast as the town's high-class prostitute, conservative mayor and eccentric sheriff, respectively.

Characters
 Seamus O'Neill (Fisher Stevens)
 Chaucy Caldwell (Denise Crosby)
 Sheriff Cody Jeremiah Jefferson (Brian Thompson)
 Dr. Reilly Clarke (Kim Myers) 
 Abednigo "JoJo" Nabuli (Terrence 'T.C.' Carson) 
 Savannah Sumner (Jennifer Tilly)
 Hector Allegria (Geno Silva)
 Roosevelt "King" Cole (Ivory Ocean)
 Paul "Gumbo" Beausoleil (Leland Crooke)
 Rikki (Lara Piper)
 Hunter Farmer (Michael Covert)
 Flame (Jennifer Barlow)

Episodes

External links
 
 Mile 0: The KEY WEST     Compendium 

1990s American comedy-drama television series
Fox Broadcasting Company original programming
English-language television shows
1993 American television series debuts
1993 American television series endings
Television shows set in Florida
Television series by CBS Studios